Elizabeth Plantagenet may refer to:

By birth
Elizabeth of Lancaster, Duchess of Exeter (1364 - 1426), third child of John of Gaunt
Elizabeth of York, eldest daughter of Edward IV and wife of Henry VII
Elizabeth of York, Duchess of Suffolk, sister of Edward IV
Elizabeth of Rhuddlan, daughter of Edward I of England, wife of John I, Count of Holland and then of Humphrey de Bohun, 4th Earl of Hereford

By marriage
Elizabeth Woodville, queen consort of Edward IV.